Mateus Borges da Fonseca (born 10 May 1993) is a Portuguese footballer who plays for Casa Pia, as a midfielder.

Football career
On 11 August 2012, Fonseca made his professional debut with FC Chiasso in a 2012–13 Swiss Challenge League match against FC Wohlen.

References

External links

Football.ch profile 

1993 births
Sportspeople from Almada
Living people
Portuguese footballers
Association football midfielders
Liga Portugal 2 players
FC Chiasso players
Portuguese expatriate footballers
Expatriate footballers in Switzerland
C.D. Trofense players
C.D. Pinhalnovense players
Casa Pia A.C. players
Portugal youth international footballers